The 1961 Coupe de France Final was a football match held at Stade Olympique Yves-du-Manoir, Colombes on May 7, 1961, that saw UA Sedan-Torcy defeat Nîmes Olympique 3–1 thanks to goals by Max Fulgenzi, Claude Brény and Mohamed Salem.

Match details

See also
Coupe de France 1960-61

External links
Coupe de France results at Rec.Sport.Soccer Statistics Foundation
Report on French federation site

Coupe De France Final
1961
Coupe De France Final 1961
Coupe De France Final 1961
Sport in Hauts-de-Seine
May 1961 sports events in Europe
1961 in Paris